In psychology, limbic imprint refers to the process by which prenatal, perinatal and post-natal experiences imprint upon the limbic system, causing lifelong effects.  The term is used to explain how early care of a fetus and newborn is important to lifelong psychological development and has been used as an argument for alternative birthing methods, and against circumcision. Some also refer to the concept as the human emotional map, deep-seated beliefs, and values that are stored in the brain's limbic system. When a fetus or newborn experiences trauma, the brain will register trauma as normal affecting the newborn into adulthood. However, when a fetus or newborn does not experience trauma, the brain will develop healthy coping mechanisms that work effectively into adulthood.

This phenomenon, since experienced during prenatal, perinatal and postnatal stages, generally affects children. Different types of perinatal and childhood experiences shape the future experiences of adults. This means that if a child is born under traumatic circumstances, then as an adult trauma will register as normal in the brain. Trauma will become expected and because of this early imprinting, adults may be more susceptible to dangerous or abusive situations. This also depends on the circumstance in which they were born and can negatively impact the adult through their lifespan.

Prenatal psychologists have suggested that it is possible to “reverse” the effects of negative imprinting. To improve their future experiences, individuals that have been negatively impacted, need to recognize, accept, and change their perspectives on their past experiences. However, there are not currently any cures or much research done for correcting a negative imprint. There are such therapies as re-coding meditation, which seeks to reset the imprints that were made upon an individual during gestation and shortly after. Many of these therapies can be done individually or within a group setting. Some individuals experience lifelong prognoses such as lowered depressive symptoms or a happier psyche in general. More recently experimentation on psychedelic assisted therapy seems to offer a technique to address these issues.

Limbic system 

Limbic imprint is a psychological concept associated with the limbic system. The limbic system includes the structures of the brain that control emotions, memories, and arousal. Through the prefrontal cortex, the system plays a role in the expression of moods and emotional feelings. The structures most involved with Limbic Imprint are known as the hippocampus and amygdala. The hippocampus is majorly associated with memory. The process of imprinting emotional and physical experiences into the brain utilizes memory functions. While the emotional regulation and responses of these experiences are majorly associated with and controlled by the amygdala. The system's connections with the cerebral cortex allow an individual to experience negative or positive feeling through his perceptions and he remembers such event with accompanying feeling.

It is said that male and female limbic systems are different. The use of the limbic system also differs in the sense that women use its more recently evolved part while the more ancient part showed more activity in men. These explain why women are more capable of remembering emotions and memories than men. Women are also more likely influenced by emotional attachments in their decision making.

Incidence 

As opposed to other psychological concepts, the limbic imprint is not specific to or more common in one group of people but is applicable to everyone. All human beings are affected, in some way, by their experiences in utero, their experiences during birth, and their first experiences after birth.

Causes 

Trauma is a form of damage to either the mind or body that results from a distressing event. Traumatic experiences can occur in utero, during birth, and/or after birth. Trauma experienced in utero includes maternal smoking, alcohol or drug use during pregnancy; exposure to toxins such as methylmercury; and even exposure to maternal psycho-social stress. Trauma in utero increases the risk of neurodevelopmental delays and disorders causing a long-term effect on limbic imprinting such as difficulty regulating and processing emotions. Trauma experienced during birth includes the use of interventions during labor such as obstetrical forceps or vacuum extraction, cesarean section, or exposure to medicines used to relieve maternal pain or induce labor. These experiences can cause both physical and psychological harm to the baby that also affects the limbic imprinting process. Finally, trauma experienced after birth can include malnutrition; neglect, physical, emotional, or sexual abuse; and lack of a safe or healthy environment. Traumatic experiences after birth also have long-term effects on limbic imprinting.

Effects 

Stress and trauma experienced as a baby in the womb will turn into a normal expectation when born. As Freud has identified, infant development is affected severely by negative limbic imprints on the brain because at this stage the "Ego" is vulnerable and susceptible adverse effects. This is in part due to an infant's brain being in a state of rapid development. Other effects include difficulty maintaining interpersonal relationships, dealing with overstimulation, and emotional regulation. On the other hand, a baby that is nurtured in hormones like Oxytocin will develop well physically.

There are four stops in the trauma loop of the Limbic System in the brain that occurs when an individual is experiencing a negative imprint effect. The brain moves in the first stage called "Hyper alert to danger". This is when the individual is highly sensitive to the stimulus. The Limbic System then moves into the "Normal Cue or Danger Cue" comes in. This lets the individual know whether the situation is dangerous or if it is a safe condition. Thirdly, the brain experiences a "Fight or Flight Freeze" and the individual cannot process how to react to the situation or stimulus presenting itself. Lastly, the limbic system reaches a point where the brain cannot take in information to understand the cues that it is receiving. This cycle continues and can continually put an individual at an increased risk for traumatic experiences to reoccur.

Treatment  

There are therapists who recognize that body and emotions - facilitated by experiences - leave imprints in deep neuronal circuits of the limbic brain and use such position to devise psychological interventions such as the therapy within a group setting. Some therapists suggest a course of "limbic repatterning" to consciously rewrite bad limbic imprints and thus improve the patient's overall psychological health.

Another suggested therapy is called "Limbic System Therapy". In this therapy, the patients participate in physical experiences that contradict the limbic imprint. For example, an individual that has low self-esteem may be given an activity to deliberately make them feel good about themselves like positive affirmation exercises. The more the patient participates in this "re-wiring" the better they will feel about themselves and thus correcting a negative imprint.

According to psychologists, there are many more ways to help with re-coding a negative imprint. These strategies include things such as journaling, talking and sharing feelings, and participating in body therapies like a body massage. Other strategies psychologists suggest are spending time with loved ones, positive thinking, breathing awareness, body awareness, relaxation, meditation, and/or prayer. Regular exercise and warm baths are also suggested by professionals.

Criticisms 

The major problem with limbic imprint is that there is very little scientific research done specifically on the concept. There is plenty of research on trauma and how it affects people as they develop which is useful to explain limbic imprint. However, standing alone, limbic imprint is fairly new and more common in pop-culture psychology than in research/scientific psychology.

References 

Pseudoscience